The 62nd Infantry Regiment was a regular infantry regiment in the United States Army.

History

WW I
The regiment was organized in 1917, in California and assigned to the 15th Infantry Brigade a component of the 8th Division at Camp Fremont, CA.  The regiment departed Camp Fremont, on 18 October 1918, with elements of 15th Infantry Brigade for movement to Camp Mills, NY and then movement overseas to France. On 22 October 1918, the 62nd Regiment and the 15th Infantry Brigade were detached from the 8th Division and remained at Camp Mills, NY.

Lineage 
Constituted 15 May 1917 in the Regular Army as the 62nd Infantry. Organized 1 June 1917 at the Presidio of San Francisco, California, from personnel of the 12th infantry. Assigned to the 8th Infantry Division 17 December 1917. 8th Infantry Division demobilized 5 September 1919 at Camp Dix, NJ and relieved from assignment.
 Redesignated as the 62nd Infantry (Philippine Scouts) and reorganized 25 March 1921 in the Philippine islands from personnel of the 4th Philippine Infantry (provisional). Inactivated November 1921 at Fort Mills, Philippine islands. Disbanded 31 July 1922.

Reconstituted in the Regular Army as the 62nd Armored Infantry Regiment and assigned to the 14th Armored Division. 31 August 1942. Activated 15 November 1942 at Camp Chaffee, Arkansas. Regiment broken up 20 September 1943 and its elements reorganized as elements of the 14th Armored Division and redesignated as follows:
 62nd Armored Infantry (less 1st and 2nd Battalions) as the 62nd Armored Infantry Battalion.
 1st Battalion as the 68th Armored Infantry Battalion.
 2nd Battalion as the 19th Armored Infantry Battalion.

Redesignations 
19th Armored Infantry Battalion redesignated as 562d Armored Infantry Battalion 25 February 1953.
68th Armored Infantry Battalion redesignated as 568th Armored Infantry Battalion 25 February 1953.

Campaign streamers 
Rhineland
Ardennes-Alsace
Central Europe

Coat of arms 
Blazon
Shield: Azure, a grizzly bear passant proper.
Crest: On a wreath, argent and azure, a setting sun.

This regiment was organized at the Presidio of San Francisco in 1917 which is symbolized by the grizzly bear from the flag and seal of California and the setting sun. The shield is blue for infantry.

See also 
 Distinctive unit insignia (U.S. Army)

References

External links 
 http://www.history.army.mil/html/forcestruc/lh.html

062
United States Army regiments of World War I